Toxopyrgota is a genus of flies in the family Pyrgotidae.

Species 
T. inclinata Hendel, 1914

References 

Pyrgotidae
Diptera of Africa
Brachycera genera
Taxa named by Friedrich Georg Hendel